The Bull-Jackson House, also known as Hill-Hold Museum, is located on NY 416 in the town of Hamptonburgh in Orange County, New York. It has been on the National Register of Historic Places since May 17, 1974.

The stone structure was built in 1769 by early settler Thomas Bull, who also gave his name to the county's largest park, just across Route 416. Orange County took possession of the house from the last of Bull's direct descendants in the late 1960s, and today it and the surrounding farmstead is operated as a museum of early life in the region.

The museum grounds contain a summer kitchen, a one-room school house, a smoke house, farms animals and gift shop.

Thomas Bull, mason, also built Knox's Headquarters State Historic Site in Vails Gate, New York.

Notes

External links
Hill-Hold Museum
Thomas Bull Memorial Park

Houses on the National Register of Historic Places in New York (state)
Houses in Orange County, New York
National Register of Historic Places in Orange County, New York
Houses completed in 1769
Museums in Orange County, New York
Farm museums in New York (state)
Historic house museums in New York (state)